MS  Europa Palace is a fast ropax ferry owned by Grimaldi Lines and operated by Minoan Grimaldi Lines. The ship previously named Cruise Olbia and did the Civitavecchia-Olbia route.  Built in 2001 as Superfast VI by Howaldtswerke-Deutsche Werft (HDW) in Kiel, Germany for Attica Group's subsidiary Superfast Ferries, she was sold to the Genting Group in 2013, Renamed Bimini Superfast for the Bimini-Miami route. In 2016 she was sold to her current owners.

Concept and construction
Superfast VI was built at HDW in Kiel for Superfast Ferries' Adriatic Sea services, along with her sister ship Superfast V. She was the second ship in the third pair of ropax ferries built for Superfast Ferries from various ship yards in Northern Europe. She was ordered in July 1998, alongside sister ship  and another pair for Baltic sea services, Superfast VII and VIII She was launched from dry dock on 11 March 2000 and was due to be delivered at the end of July 2000, but after many months of delays due to technical problems, she was delivered to Superfast Ferries on 6 February 2001. After many months of delays due to technical problems, Howaldtswerke-Deutsche Werft (HDW) was forced to pay hefty penalties due to the late delivery.

Service history

2001-2013: Superfast VI

Superfast VI entered service on 2 March 2001 on Superfast Ferries Patras—Igoumenitsa-Ancona route.  In March 2013 Superfast VI was sold to Genting Group, she was handed over to her new owners on 6 April 2013.

2013-2016: Bimini Superfast 
After Genting Group took over their new ship, she was renamed Bimini Superfast. She departed Patras and sailed to Málaga in Spain for remodeling. After a few weeks she departed Málaga and sailed to USA for final fitting out works to be completed. Bimini Superfast was due to begin service with the Bimini cruise from Miami on 6 June 2013 but the US Coast Guard did not give approval for the ship to sail in US waters. This was due to deficiencies with the crew and the ship, even though it had been sailing in Europe for many years with no compliance issues. After several weeks of work, the US Coast Guard gave Bimini Superfast final clearance to sail.  On 20 June 2013 she finally made her first crossing from Miami to Bimini.

Bimini Superfast operated 2 and 3 night cruises from Miami. They depart Miami at 7PM, spend 2 or 3 nights at Bimini and returns to Miami at 1PM on the third or fourth day. Passengers are required to have passports if staying on the Island but this is not required if lodging on the ship. The 50 mile trip to Bimini Island takes about 3 hours. With the completion of the pier in Bimini Bay as of 18 September 2014 passengers are no longer tendered by ferry from the ship to the island. Passengers disembark directly on the island from the cruise ship, saving about 60 minutes of ferry time each way. Once in Bimini, passengers disembark to visit Resorts World Bimini Bay Resort and Casino via a free tram.

Part of the business plan of Genting for the Bimini Superfast was to carry out evening gambling and party cruises to nowhere, but due to visa issues with the hotel staff being foreign nationals, the US government has ruled that they can no longer offer these cruises, as the passengers never set foot in another country. As a consequence Bimini Superfast completed her last cruise to nowhere on 28 November 2013. However the Bimini Superfast ceased operating on 10 January 2016 after only 3 years of operation.
Genting announced in January 2016 of its plans to cease the service from Florida to Bimini, it was sold to Grimaldi Lines of Italy.

2016-2021: Cruise Olbia

In January Grimaldi Lines announced the purchase of the Bimini Superfast, to be placed on Livorno-Olbia route, replacing the Zeus Palace, which will be placed on the Civitavecchia-Olbia route.

2021-onwards: Europa Palace

In February 2021 Grimaldi Lines announced that MS Cruise Olympia and MS Cruise Europa will be transferred to Grimaldi Group and will make Civitavecchia-Olbia route. The former Cruise Olbia will be replace the first Cruise in the Adriatic route under the name Europa Palace and will be operate by Grimaldi Minoan Lines. The ship left her route for Naples where its name will change to Europa Palace.

References

External links

 Superfast VI at marinetraffic.com
 Bimini superfast aerial video as it departs from the Port of Miami

Ferries of Florida
Ships built in Kiel
2000 ships
05
Bimini